Jim White (18 October 1901 – 6 March 1964) was an Australian cricketer. He played twenty first-class matches for Cambridge University and New South Wales between 1922 and 1926.

See also
 List of New South Wales representative cricketers

References

External links
 

1901 births
1964 deaths
Australian cricketers
Cambridge University cricketers
New South Wales cricketers